The Way We Live Now is an adaptation of the 1875 novel The Way We Live Now by Anthony Trollope as a five-part serial for television. Adapted by Simon Raven and directed by James Cellan Jones, it was first broadcast in weekly episodes each Saturday evening on BBC Two, from 5 April to 3 May 1969.

Partial cast
Colin Blakely - Augustus Melmotte
Rachel Gurney - Lady Carbury
Sharon Gurney - Henrietta Carbury
Cavan Kendall - Sir Felix Carbury
Irene Prador - Madame Melmotte
Angharad Rees - Marie Melmotte
Sarah Brackett - Mrs Hurtle

References

External links

1969 British television series debuts
1969 British television series endings
1960s British drama television series
Television shows based on British novels
English-language television shows